Joseph Williams (born 1873) was an English footballer. His regular position was as a forward. He was born in Crewe, Cheshire. He played for Manchester United and Macclesfield Town.

External links 
MUFCInfo.com profile

1873 births
English footballers
Manchester United F.C. players
Macclesfield Town F.C. players
Sportspeople from Crewe
Year of death missing
Association football forwards